On April 23, 1819, incumbent Federalist senator Alexander Contee Hanson died.  The other incumbent senator, Robert Henry Goldsborough, ran for re-election to hold his seat.
The Maryland legislature elected a successor to finish Hanson's term, as well as a senator for the term for the other class.  The two top vote-getters (both Democratic-Republicans) were declared the winners, with the first place winner, Edward Lloyd taking the Class 3 seat, which ran March 4, 1819, to March 3, 1825.  The second place winner, William Pinkney, took the Class 1 seat, finishing Hanson's term which ran March 4, 1817, to March 3, 1823.

 √ Edward Lloyd (Democratic-Republican) 28.41%
 √ William Pinkney (Democratic-Republican) 27.84%
 Charles Carroll (Federalist) 21.02%
 Robert Henry Goldsborough (Federalist) 19.32%
 Charles Goldsborough (Federalist) 2.27%
 Samuel Smith (Unknown) 0.57%
 John Graham (Democratic-Republican) 0.57%

See also
 1818 and 1819 United States Senate elections

References
 

United States Senate
Maryland
1819
Maryland 1819
Maryland 1819
United States Senate 1819